Richard Vick  (April 16, 1892 – September 1980) was a professional American football player who spent three seasons in the National Football League (NFL) with the Kenosha Maroons, Detroit Panthers and the Canton Bulldogs.

Vick played on the 1921 Washington & Jefferson team that played California to a 0–0 tie in the 1922 Rose Bowl.  He transferred to the University of Michigan where he played on the undefeated 1923 Michigan Wolverines football team.  His brother, Ernie Vick, was an All-American football player at Michigan and played major league baseball and in the NFL.  He and his brother both attended Scott High School in Toledo, Ohio.

References

External links
 

1892 births
1980 deaths
Canton Bulldogs players
Detroit Panthers players
Kenosha Maroons players
Michigan Wolverines football players
People from Gallatin County, Montana
People from Kandiyohi County, Minnesota
Players of American football from Minnesota
Players of American football from Ohio
Sportspeople from Toledo, Ohio
Washington & Jefferson Presidents football players